Yi Byeok (李檗, 1754-1785) was a scholar of Korea’s later Joseon period who, in 1784, played a leading role in the foundation of Korea’s first Catholic community.  It is reported in one source that his original name was Yi Taek-jo.

Biography

Early years
Yi Byeok was born in 1754 in Gyeonggi-do, Pocheon-gun, Naechon-myeon, Hwahyeon-ri. His ja was Deok-jo (德操) his ho Gwang-am (曠庵). His father was Yi Bu-man (李溥萬), 1727-1817, of the Gyeongju Yi clan, and his mother was a member of the Cheongju Han clan. He was the second son among six children.

His grandfather Yi Geun had held a high rank in the army, and his father, elder brother Yi Gyeok (李格), and younger brother Yi Seok (李晳) were also military officials. Yi Byeok was remarkably tall, and his father tried to make a soldier of him; but from an early age he refused, earning himself the nickname Byeok, (either 蘗, (corktree) or 僻, implying isolation and oddity) for his stubbornness.

His family belonged to the Namin faction, which included many families residing in Gyeonggi-do, and as such, except for a few years when Yi Byeok was alive, were excluded from holding office by the factional politics of the Joseon period. This exclusion from power might explain why many of the scholars from these families pursued studies, which indicated their dissent from orthodox Neo-Confucianism. Yi Byeok decided at an early age not to study for the national examinations, which were necessary for a career in government administration. Instead, he chose pure scholarship, focusing on the Chinese Confucian classics, studying the Four Books and the Five Classics as a matter of course.

Yi Byeok's great-grandfather, Yi Gyeong-sang, had accompanied Crown Prince Sohyeon (1612-1645) during the eight years that he spent in China. It is likely that he brought back books written by the Jesuit missionaries (“Western Learning”), including those about Catholicism which Yi Byeok later studied.

The writings of Seongho Yi Ik inspired many of the scholars who adopted the Practical Learning (Silhak) approach. Yi Byeok and the other scholars with whom he explored the tenets of Catholicism in the following years were surely no exception.

Jeonjin-am
In 1777 (according to Dallet) or 1779 (according to Jeong Yak-yong), the Namin scholar Gwon Cheol-sin (權哲身, 1736-1801) seems to have started a series of study sessions for his pupils and other scholars that,  like him, were influenced by the Silhak-inspired writings of his teacher, Seongho Yi Ik.

These meetings were held in a remote mountain hermitage, Jeonjin-am, which belonged to Ju-eo-sa temple near Gwangju, Gyeonggi-do.

The meetings were probably intended as an ongoing seminar to gain a better understanding of human life through renewed study of the Chinese classics, as well as the books introducing European knowledge that had been written in Chinese by Matteo Ricci and other Jesuits. If there were books about Catholicism among them, they seem only to have given a very shallow presentation of the faith. Dallet began his Histoire with a description of Yi Byeok's difficult journey to join the group.

Among those present in the group were Jeong Yak-jeon (丁若銓, 1758-1816), whose wife was Yi Byeok's sister (who had died by 1784) and (perhaps) Mancheon Yi Seung-hun (蔓川 李承薰, 1756-1801) whose wife was the sister of Jeong Yak-jeon.  Yi Byeok's wife (Gwon Ryu-Han-Dang) was a niece of Gwon Cheol-sin, being the daughter of his brother Gwon Il-sin (權日身, 1742-1792).

Conversion to Catholicism
Dallet reports that it was Yi Byeok who, on hearing in 1783 that Yi Seung-hun was to accompany his father on the annual embassy to Beijing, urged him to contact the Catholic priests there and be baptized, then bring back more information. This he duly did, receiving baptism early in 1784. He returned to Korea bringing books and objects of devotion.

Yi Byeok seems to have taken some time to study the books before declaring himself convinced. He then set about evangelizing those around him, including Gwon Cheol-sin and his younger brother Gwon Il-sin.

In the Jachan myojimyeong (autobiographical epitaph) written later by Dasan Jeong Yak-yong there is an account of a moment in April 1784 when Yi Byeok first told him about Catholicism and showed him a book. Jeong Yak-yong had a very high opinion of Yi Byeok's intellectual skills, especially after receiving his help in 1784 in formulating a reply to the king's questions about Confucian philosophy, a reply that greatly impressed the king by its “objectivity”.

Jean Sangbae Ri remarked that the theory regarding the emanation of Le and Ki had originated with Yi Byeok, who was following Yi Hwang Toegye; Jeong Yak-yong then began following the ideas expressed by Yi I Yulgok. The baptism of these first converts, including Yi Byeok, is said to have happened in September 1784, whereupon Yi Byeok took the name Jean Baptist. It is not clear whether Jeong Yak-yong was among those who were baptized then.

His older brother Jeong Yak-jong was destined to become the main leader of the community along with Yi Seung-hun and died for his faith in the persecution of 1801.

There was an immediate hostile reaction to the new religion, about which little was as yet known, among the more strictly Confucianist scholars. There was opposition even among the Namin faction.

The silk letter written in 1801 to the Bishop of Beijing by Alexander Hwang Sa-yeong included a lengthy account of the origins of the Korean church. In it, he tells how Yi Ga-hwan (李家煥, 1742-1801), who had risen to be Minister of Justice (刑曹判書, hyeongjo panseo), and was one of the most senior members of the faction and a very great scholar, tried to argue with Yi Byeok, but ended up being converted by him. He was martyred in 1801.

Arrest and death
Early in 1785, the growing group of believers and sympathizers moved their regular gatherings for worship from the house of Yi Byeok to that belonging to another convert, Kim Beom-u, on the hill where Myeongdong Cathedral now stands. Kim was not an aristocrat as so many of the others were. Almost immediately, the authorities raided the house, suspecting it of being a gambling den, and were embarrassed on finding it full of nobles. A report by a government agent to the Minister of Justice  lists those acting as leaders: Yi Seung-hun, the brothers Jeong Yak-jeon, Jeong Yak-jong, Jeong Yak-yong, Gwon Il-sin, with Yi Byeok taking the leading role as teacher during the ceremony.

All were arrested, the books that were found were confiscated, and the nobles were then sent home with a warning not to continue. However, Kim Beom-u was tortured, exiled, and finally executed since he was not of noble birth.

Dallet (Vol 1 pages 28–9) says that Yi Byeok was put under intense pressure from his father until finally, more or less, he gave up the faith. He was tormented by remorse until he died of the plague in 1786. A different account of his death is given by Antton Iraola who reported that he died on 14 June 1785, after 15 days of constant prayer, during which he neither ate nor slept. What seems clear is that his family, under strong pressure from the Confucian leaders that were hostile to the Namin and their newly found foreign faith, kept him more or less imprisoned in his home. There is no record of any communication addressed to the Catholic community emanating from him after the arrest.

The group's leadership was taken by Yi Seung-hun, who seemed to have established a native hierarchy, at least before the Bishop of Beijing intervened to stop it.

Yi Byeok's life is poorly documented and the main source for much information about him is the rather dramatized account in Dallet's Histoire de l’église de Corée (2 vols, 1874), which relied heavily on translations of documents sent to France by Bishop Daveluy (Dallet, Histoire, Vol.1, Introduction, page xi).

Works
 The only surviving texts written by Yi Byeok are found in a volume containing a collection of writings by the first Korean Catholic believers, known as Mancheon yugo (蔓川遺稿), which was discovered in about 1970. Mancheon was the ho of Yi Seung-hun, whose writings occupy a major part of the book, But it also contains two poetic works attributed to Yi Byeok, the Hymn of Adoration of the Lord of Heaven (天主恭敬歌, Cheonju gonggyeongga), and above all, much longer and more complex, the Essence of Sacred Doctrine (聖敎要旨, Seonggyo yoji). Both are translated into French in the book by Jean Sangbae Ri; unfortunately, there seems to be no English translation.
 The title to the Hymn indicates that it was composed at Ju-eo-sa temple in 1779.
 The Seonggyo yoji is especially interesting by its combination of Christian teaching and the Confucian classics, especially the Great Learning (大學, Da xue) and the Doctrine of the Mean (中庸, Zhong yong). There is no indication of when it was composed, although it shows a deeper knowledge of Christianity, including stories from the Bible, which suggest a time after Yi Byeok's study of the books brought from Beijing by Yi Seung-hun.

Grave
On June 21, 1979, the grave of Yi Byeok was discovered by chance at his birthplace. His remains were reinterred alongside those of Yi Seung-hun, Yi Ga-hwan, the Gwon brothers, and Jeong Yak-jong at the Catholic shrine that was erected on the site of Jeonjin-am.

See also
 Roman Catholicism in South Korea
 Korean Martyrs
 Jeong Yak-yong
 Yi Seung-hun

References

External links
Daum entry about Yi Byeok
 http://k.daum.net/qna/openknowledge/view.html?qid=3XUxv&

Online text of Seonggyo Yoji
 http://parabolog.wordpress.com/tag/%EC%84%B1%EA%B5%90%EC%9A%94%EC%A7%80/
 History of the Asian Missions - Introduction of Catholicism into Korea
 Chon Jin Am, The Birthplace of the Catholic Church in Korea

Print
 Dallet, Charles. Histoire de l’église de Corée, précédée d’une introduction sur l’histoire, les institutions, la langue, les moeurs et coutumes coréennes. Paris, V. Palmé. 1874  https://archive.org/details/histoiredelegli01dallgoog
 Jean Sangbae Ri. Confucius et Jésus Christ. La première théologie cjrétienne en Corée d''après l’oeuvre de Yi Piek lettré Confucéem 1754-1786. Paris: Beauchesne. 1979.
 Hoang Sa-yeng, Lettre d'Alexandre Hoang à Monseigneur de Gouvéa, évêque de Péking, 1801, traduction française avec le texte original, sous la direction de Mgr. Gustave Charles Marie Mutel. Hong Kong. 1925.

1754 births
1786 deaths
Converts to Roman Catholicism
Korean Roman Catholics